The Second Holt ministry (Liberal–Country Coalition) was the 42nd ministry of the Government of Australia. It was led by the country's 17th Prime Minister, Harold Holt. The Second Holt ministry succeeded the First Holt ministry, which dissolved on 14 December 1966 following the federal election that took place in November. The ministry was replaced by the caretaker McEwen ministry on 19 December 1967, following the disappearance of Holt.

As of 26 January 2023, Ian Sinclair and Peter Nixon are the last surviving members of the Second Holt ministry. James Forbes was the last surviving Liberal minister, and Allen Fairhall was the last surviving Liberal Cabinet minister.

Cabinet

Outer ministry

Notes

Ministries of Elizabeth II
Holt, 2
1966 establishments in Australia
1967 disestablishments in Australia
Cabinets established in 1966
Cabinets disestablished in 1967